Szczytno   is a town in northeastern Poland with 27,970 inhabitants (2004). Szczytno is situated in the Warmian-Masurian Voivodship (since 1999), but was previously in Olsztyn Voivodship (1975-1998). It is located within the historic region of Masuria.

Olsztyn-Mazury Regional Airport, located nearby, is the most important airport of the Masurian region. Szczytno, which is located on the Olsztyn – Ełk line, and used to be a railroad junction until Polish Railways closed minor connections stemming from the town towards Czerwonka and Wielbark.

Two lakes, Domowe Małe and Długie (also known as Domowe Duże), are located within the town limits.

History

Middle Ages

Near today's Szczytno are the only known megalithic tombs in Warmia-Masuria. The town was originally a settlement of Old Prussians.

Between 1350 and 1360 Ortolf von Trier, a knight of the Teutonic Order and the Komtur of Elbing (Elbląg), founded a fort in the Old Prussian region of Galindia,  probably near an Old Prussian settlement. The first mention of the fort, eponymously named Ortulfsburg, was a document from September 1360, after Ortolf invited Polish colonists from nearby Masovia, among whom the settlement became known as Szczytno. The first custodian of the settlement was Heinrich Murer. In 1370 the wooden fort was destroyed by Lithuanians led by Kęstutis, after which it was rebuilt using stone. In German, the name Ortulfsburg gradually morphed into Ortelsburg. The settlement grew in size owing to its location on a trade route from Warsaw to Königsberg (now Kaliningrad).

In the wake of the Polish-Lithuanian victory over the Order at Grunwald in 1410, the castle was occupied by Polish troops during the Thirteen Years' War. After the Second Peace of Toruń of 1466 it remained part of the Teutonic state, although under Polish suzerainty as a fiefdom. In the 15th century, a Catholic church was built, whose first parish priest became Mikołaj of Rzekwuj from the Płock land in Masovia.

Modern era

With its inclusion in the Ducal Prussia in 1525, which remained under Polish suzerainty, it lost its importance as a border fortress and began to decline. It was a overwhelmingly Polish town, and, according to Gerard Labuda, in 1538 only four townsmen did not speak Polish. Margrave and regent George Frederick (1577–1603), who enjoyed hunting nearby, began the redevelopment of the area. Among his projects was the rebuilding of the castle into a hunting lodge. King Władysław IV Vasa of Poland visited the town from 1628–29 and in 1639. Ortelsburg suffered from 17th century fires and the plague in 1656.

The town became part of the Kingdom of Prussia in 1701. King Frederick William I of Prussia granted Ortelsburg its town charter in 1723. In 1773 it was included in the newly formed province of East Prussia. Prussian King Frederick William III and Queen Louise arrived in the town on 23 November 1806 while fleeing French troops during the Fourth Coalition. The town was briefly the seat of the Prussian government, and Frederick William released his Ortelsburger Publicandum — a series of constitutional, administrative, social and economic reforms — there on 1 December 1806. Later that month, French troops occupied and plundered Ortelsburg. Six years later the town was forced to host numerous troops of the Napoleon's Grande Armée, which invaded Russia.

In 1818, after the Prussian administrative reforms, Ortelsburg became the seat of Landkreis Ortelsburg, one of the largest in East Prussia. The town became part of the German Empire in 1871 during the unification of Germany.

It became an important center of the Polish movement in Masuria and resistance to Germanisation. In 1849-1851 a bilingual folk magazine Der masurische Hahn/Kurek Mazurski was issued in the town. The Masurian People's Party (Mazurska Partia Ludowa), founded in 1896 in Lyck (Ełk), had one of its main branches here. From 1906 the Polish newspaper Mazur was published here, and in 1910, Bogumił Labusz and Gustaw Leyding founded the Masurian People's Bank (Mazurski Bank Ludowy). In 1908 Polish writer and Nobel Prize laureate Henryk Sienkiewicz, who popularized the small town through his historical novel The Knights of the Cross and whose works were published in Mazur, visited the town. In post-war Poland, a monument to Sienkiewicz was unveiled in the town center, next to the town hall and the ruins of the castle.

Historical population

World War I and interbellum 

Ortelsburg was almost completely destroyed at the beginning of World War I by troops of the Russian Empire, 160 houses and 321 commercial buildings burned down between 27 and 30 August 1914. The town's recovery was supported by contributions raised in Berlin and Vienna. In 1916 the Viennese modernist Josef Hoffmann visited Ortelsburg, his plans for a new town hall were not carried out. A new town hall, an example of Nazi architecture in East Prussia, was finally built in 1938 and listed as a historical monument in 1991. The initial plans for the reconstruction of the town were based on Bruno Möhring's work but carried out by several local architects.

The East Prussian plebiscite of 11 July 1920, which was held according to the Versailles treaty under the supervision of Allied troops, resulted in 5,336 votes for Germany and 15 for Poland. It was preceded by persecution of local Polish activists by the Germans, pro-Polish rallies and meetings were dispersed. On January 21, 1920 ("Bloody Wednesday") a German militia armed with crowbars, metal rods, and shovels, attacked the gathering of local Polish activists and severely beat local Polish leaders Bogumił Linka and Bogumił Leyk, all at the instigation of the local German authorities. Even after the plebiscite pro-Polish voters and activists were still persecuted.

During the interwar period, Polish-speaking residents of the region organized Samopomoc Mazurska ("Masurian Self-Help"), an organisation for the protection of Poles in southern East Prussia. A Polish activist Jerzy Lanc was killed during his attempt to establish a Polish school. Ortelsburg was the location of the Polish House, in which meetings of Polish journalists and activists were held. The Polish House was the headquarters of such organisations as "Zjednoczenie Mazurskie", "Samopomoc Mazurska" and the Union of Poles in Germany. Today the building is dedicated to the memory of the people and institutions that were engaged in Polish movement in Masuria. Some Polish activists managed to flee in the 1930s.

In the March 1933 German federal election, after the Nazi seizure of power and suppression of anti-Nazi political factions, the Nazi Party polled 76.6% of vote in Ortelsburg, compared to the national German average of only 43.9%.

World War II and post-war Poland
Near the end of World War II, most of the town's German population fled before the Red Army. Those who remained behind were either killed in the final months of the war or expelled after its end. The town was placed under Polish administration in 1945 under border changes promulgated at the Potsdam Conference, renamed to the historic Polish Szczytno and gradually repopulated with Poles. The first group of Poles expelled from former Eastern Poland, which was annexed by the Soviet Union, arrived to Szczytno in June 1945 from Volhynia.

After the war, the town's life was organized anew. In 1946-1948 new schools were founded, including a pedagogical school, a vocational school and a school for kindergarten teachers. In 1947 a public library was founded and in 1954 a culture center was established. Since 1948, the town hall, besides the local administration, also houses the Masurian Museum in Szczytno (Muzeum Mazurskie w Szczytnie).

The nearby Szczytno-Szymany International Airport, as well as Stare Kiejkuty, a military intelligence training base, came under scrutiny in late 2005 as one of the suspected "black sites" (secret prisons or transfer stations) used in the CIA's program of so-called extraordinary rendition of accused terrorists.  The existence of the nearby training base and the record of CIA-registered affiliated aircraft having landing at Szczytno-Szymany have been unequivocally confirmed, but the Polish government has repeatedly denied any involvement of these facilities in extraordinary renditions.

To commemorate old Masurian folk traditions, a number of Pofajdok sculptures were placed in Szczytno.

Sights

Among the historic sights of Szczytno are the ruins of the castle, the pre-war town hall, which houses the municipal and county authorities, as well as the Masurian Museum (Muzeum Mazurskie), dedicated to the history, ethnology and culture of Masuria and Szczytno, a Baroque Evangelical church, the pre-war Polish House (Dom Polski), which was the center of social and cultural life of the local Polish community during the times of Germanisation and the well-preserved old wooden Masurian House (Chata Mazurska). Also are located there the Gothic Revival Catholic Church of the Assumption and Baptist Church, the historic buildings of the district court, nursing home, tax office, police school, post office and former brewery.

Sports
Football club SKS Szczytno (formerly Gwardia Szczytno) is based in the town. It played in the Polish second division in the 1980s.

Notable residents

 Julie Salinger (1863–1942), politician 
 Rose Scooler, née Guttfeld, (1882-1985), survivor of Theresienstadt concentration camp
 Hans Jürgen von der Wense (1894–1966) was a German poet, composer, photographer, aphorist and hiker
 Wolfgang Koeppen (1906–1996), German author, whose autobiographical film evoking a lost rural idyll, Es war einmal in Masuren, was set here
 Horst Kopkow (1910–1996), Nazi spy who cooperated with British intelligence after World War II
 Hansjoachim Linde (1926-2020), German general
 Hans-Peter Reinecke (1926–2003), German musicologist
 Christine Laszar (born 1931), German actress
 Klaus Kilimann (born 1938) is a physicist who became an SPD politician after 1989
 Krzysztof Klenczon (1942–1981), Polish musician
 Waldemar Kobus (born 1966), German actor
 Maurycy Stefanowicz (born 1976), Polish musician and guitarist
 Jakub Żulczyk (born 1983), Polish writer and journalist
 Konrad Bukowiecki (born 1997), Polish athlete competing primarily in the shot put

References

Populated places established in the 1350s
Castles of the Teutonic Knights
Cities and towns in Warmian-Masurian Voivodeship
Szczytno County